La Vingtaine du Nord is one of the three vingtaines of the Parish of St John in Jersey, Channel Islands. It contains the second highest point in Jersey at Mont Mado (473 ft).

The Vingtaine du Nord, Vingtaine de Hérupe and Vingtaine du Douet all form a single electoral district of St John.

Places in the vingtaine

Bonne Nuit
Frémont Point Transmitter
La Crête Fort
Wolf's Caves
Le Mont Mado

Nord (St John)
Saint John, Jersey